Rhoda Lillian Rennie (2 May 1905 in Benoni – 11 March 1963) was a South African freestyle swimmer who competed in the 1928 Summer Olympics.

In 1928 she was a member of the South African relay team which won the bronze medal in the 4×100 m freestyle relay event. She also competed in the 100 metre freestyle competition and in the 400 metre freestyle event, but was in both eliminated in the first round.

Rennie committed suicide in Johannesburg in 1963.

References

External links
Rhoda Rennie's profile at Sports Reference.com
Rhoda Rennie's obituary
Rhoda Rennie's grave

1905 births
1963 suicides
People from Benoni
Transvaal Colony people
South African female swimmers
South African female freestyle swimmers
Olympic swimmers of South Africa
Swimmers at the 1928 Summer Olympics
Olympic bronze medalists for South Africa
Olympic bronze medalists in swimming
Medalists at the 1928 Summer Olympics
Sportspeople from Gauteng
Suicides in South Africa
20th-century South African women